Hakea conchifolia, commonly known as the shell-leaved hakea is a shrub in the family Proteaceae native to an area in the west coast of the  Wheatbelt region of Western Australia. An attractive small species with unusual rigid leaves that encircle the flowers.

Description
The branch surface varies they may be covered with red-brown long soft hairs, coarse rough longish hairs or densely covered in short soft matted hairs fading at flowering. Grey-green leaves are hairless, widest near the stem divided both sides of a central stalk in a feather-like appearance. Most leaves are broadly egg-shaped or heart-shaped with sharply scalloped edges, doubled over encircling the flowers. The inflorescence appears in the leaf axil and  consists of 15–18 flowers. Creamy-white rarely pink flowers appear in winter from June to August.

Taxonomy and naming
Hakea conchifolia was first formally described by the botanist William Jackson Hooker in 1842 as part of the work Icones Plantarum. The only synonyms are Hakea cucullata and Hakea cucullata var. conchifolia.
The specific epithet (conchifolia) is derived from the Latin words concha meaning "snail" or "shell" and folium meaning "leaf" referring to the resemblance of the leaves to sea shells.

Distribution and habitat
Shell-leaved hakea grows in the northern sand plains of Irwin south to the foothills of the Darling Ranges of Perth.  Hakea conchifolia grows in sand, loam and gravelly soils in heathland or low woodland in areas of good drainage.

Conservation status
Hakea conchifolia is classified as "not threatened" by the Western Australian Government Department of Parks and Wildlife.

References

conchifolia
Eudicots of Western Australia
Plants described in 1842
Taxa named by William Jackson Hooker